The 40th Directors Guild of America Awards, honoring the outstanding directorial achievements in film and television in 1987, were presented on March 12, 1988 at the Beverly Hilton and the Plaza Hotel. The feature film nominees were announced on February 1, 1988 and nominees in eight television categories were announced on February 8, 1988.

Winners and nominees

Film

Television

Commercials

D.W. Griffith Award
 Robert Wise

Frank Capra Achievement Award
 Alex Hapsas

Robert B. Aldrich Service Award
 Sheldon Leonard

Honorary Life Member
 Michael H. Franklin

References

External links
 

Directors Guild of America Awards
1987 film awards
1987 television awards
Direct
Direct
Directors
1988 in Los Angeles
1988 in New York City
March 1988 events in the United States